Test Track is a high-speed slot car thrill ride located in World Discovery at Epcot, a theme park at the Walt Disney World Resort in Bay Lake, Florida. The ride is a simulated excursion through the rigorous testing procedures that General Motors uses to evaluate its concept cars, culminating in a high-speed drive around the exterior of the attraction.

The attraction soft-opened to the public on December 19, 1998, after a long delay due to problems revealed during testing and to changes in design. As a result, the attraction officially opened on March 17, 1999. Test Track replaced the World of Motion ride, which closed three years earlier in 1996.

Originally, guests rode in "test vehicles" in a GM "testing facility" through a series of assessments to illustrate how automobile prototype evaluations were conducted. The highlight of the attraction is a speed trial on a track around the exterior of the building at a top speed of 64.9 miles per hour (104.4 km/h) making it the fastest Disney theme park attraction ever built.

Test Track closed for refurbishment on April 15, 2012, and re-opened on December 6, 2012. It is now sponsored by the Chevrolet brand instead of General Motors as a whole. Guests now design their own car in the Chevrolet Design Studio. Then they board a "Sim-Car" and are taken through the "digital" testing ground of the "SimTrack". Throughout the ride, guests see how their designs performed in each test. After the ride, guests can see how their car did overall, film a commercial, race their designs, and have a picture taken with their own virtually designed vehicle with a chosen backdrop in the background.

Test Track is located in World Discovery, formerly known as Future World East.

History

Test Track Presented by General Motors (March 1999–April 2012)
World of Motion was an attraction that was located in the current building of Test Track and was sponsored by General Motors. When the sponsorship expired, GM was in the process of conducting lay-offs and cutbacks forcing the company to question whether or not to sign another sponsorship agreement. Upon deciding to sign another agreement, GM wanted Disney to construct a new ride on the site of World of Motion. The new ride would focus specifically around their automobiles, rather than the fanciful history of transportation from the pre-historic (animal transportation) to the modern age (automobiles, planes, etc.) that were previously housed in the space. In 1976, Disney Imagineers had visited GM's Milford Proving Ground; the Imagineers later made a second trip to the facility as they designed Test Track. After numerous problems encountered during the construction of the ride, Test Track soft-opened on December 19, 1998, but did not officially open until March 17, 1999, nearly two years later than planned.

In November 1995, Epcot announced that World of Motion would be transformed into Test Track. After the attraction closed on January 2, 1996, everything inside the ride building was removed. Meanwhile, the elevated track was already being constructed outside and behind the building, part of the high-speed test portion of the ride. Work outside the building began in the fall of 1995, while work inside the building began in the spring of 1996. The ride was scheduled to open 29 months after World of Motion's closing, in May 1997, but after numerous problems arose, the ride opening was delayed by nearly two years. The cars used on the ride were designed to resemble the look of a test car that is used to go through multiple safety tests.

Throughout the construction of Test Track, numerous problems occurred causing delays in the ride opening. After failing to open as scheduled in May 1997, park officials announced on October 15, 1997 that the opening was delayed until at least sometime in 1998. The first problem that Imagineers had to overcome was that the wheels used on the ride vehicles could not stand up to the demand of the ride course and speed. This problem was resolved but a second, more critical issue caused the ride to be delayed by over a year. For Test Track to run with the highest hourly capacity possible, twenty-nine ride vehicles would be needed. The ride's programming system could only handle operating a maximum of six cars over the layout of the ride, and the system suffered frequent software crashes. The original software was scrapped, and eventually programmers were able to get the computer system able to run twenty-nine ride vehicles at once. Despite some rumors about rain affecting the outdoor segment, park officials assured that weather issues were not a factor in the delay. In August 1998, Disney announced that the opening of Test Track would be delayed once again. Officials told park guests that the technology was new and still being developed. Reports planned to reschedule the opening for 1999. After the problems were resolved, Test Track soft-opened to the public on December 19, 1998. The ride was still prone to breakdowns and did not officially open until March 17, 1999.

Even after its grand opening, the ride still suffered from frequent downtime, although efficiency gradually improved. Shortly after its opening, to improve capacity, Test Track was one of the first rides at the Disney parks to employ a dedicated single rider line. The six-seated cars were often left with empty seats, as most riders arrived in groups of two or four. The single rider line helped each car leave full and reduce long lines. In November 1999, Epcot added a FASTPASS entrance to Test Track.

Test Track Presented by Chevrolet (December 2012–present)
On January 6, 2012, Disney Parks announced plans to renovate Test Track during the second and third quarters of the year and re-open the ride by fall 2012. As part of the update, Test Track's sponsor became General Motors' Chevrolet marque instead of GM as a whole. The new additions include a pre-show area where guests "design" a new car for testing in the Chevrolet Design Center, then they board Test Track's existing six-passenger ride vehicles, to be known as "SimCars", to see how their design fares on the Center's driving course. The experience concludes in a renovated showroom featuring current and future Chevrolet products. The ride vehicles were repainted and while the track was unchanged, the setting was overhauled. On April 27, 2012, Walt Disney's social media manager Jennifer Fickley-Baker released a set of concept design photos. Within the photos, it was confirmed that the ride will have 4 main tests: capability, efficiency, responsiveness, and power. The ride closed on April 15, 2012 and soon later, barriers were placed along all walk-ways leading to either the entrance or exit of the ride. Also, a musical show called "Test Track All Stars" was added in front of the former main entrance to Test Track, which closed on December 4, 2012. The refurbished attraction first opened to guests during a soft opening on December 3, 2012. The grand re-opening took place on December 6, 2012.

Test Track was closed on January 13, 2020 for a refurbishment. It then reopened a month later on February 26. On September 2, the attraction was shut down again due to technical issues.

Ride overview

1999–2012

Queue
During the first part of the queue, guests viewed a sample repair and test shop. As guests entered the queue in the welcome center they were shown tests performed on cars and parts before being released.  The queue wound by different tests for tires and car doors, an anechoic chamber for radio receivers, and an area for crash test dummies to be tested.  At the end of the queue, a group of guests would be brought into a briefing room where they were shown automobile testing facilities and examples of tests being performed.  The host, Bill McKim (John Michael Higgins) told the guests that they would take part in some of these tests and also told the technician Sherrie what tests to set up.  Small videos of each test were shown as he spoke.  He finally told her to choose one final "surprise test," and a video of a car crashing into a barrier was shown as a door opened for guests to enter the interior queue.

Ride
Upon reaching the end of the second queue, guests were loaded into test cars. Upon dispatching from the loading dock, the car was brought through an accelerated hill climb. Next, the car's suspension was tested over different types of road surfaces, including German and Belgian blocks & cobblestones. Next, the car's anti-lock braking system was turned off and the car tried to navigate a course of cones, knocking many over in the process. The anti-lock brakes were then turned back on and a similar cone course was navigated easily. Guests were shown a video overlay of the difference. Then, the cars were brought through three environmental chambers: the heat chamber (featuring 192 heat lamps), the cold chamber, and the corrosion chamber (featuring robots on both sides that spray yellow mist).

The handling of the car was then tested. It climbed a set of hills with blind turns while increasing its speed by 10% each time. At the top, the car almost crashes into an oncoming semi-truck before swerving out of the way.  The car was now brought to the final test shown in the briefing room: the barrier test. The car lined up across from a barrier and began to accelerate towards it.  Just before hitting the barrier a series of flashes occurred, where a picture of the guests was taken, and the barrier opened to a track outside. The car traveled along a straightaway into a boot-shaped turnaround over an employee parking lot, then took a lap around the building with banked turns and a max speed of 64.9  mph (104.6  km/h). As the car returned to the loading dock, a thermal scan was taken of the guests and shown on a large screen.

Like many Disney attractions, Test Track exited into a themed gift shop featuring merchandise associated with the attraction. Guests could also view and purchase photos taken of their vehicle on the ride or scan their Photopass to view or purchase the photos later. There was also an area where there was a showroom of the all-new, prototype, or legendary GM vehicles.

Post Show: The Assembly Experience
Experience designer Bob Rogers and the design team BRC Imagination Arts, were commissioned to create the new post-show experience entitled "The Assembly Experience."  The Assembly Experience is a walk-through environment, giving guests the illusion that they are on the floor of a vast automotive assembly plant. Automotive doors, seats and engines glide overhead on assembly line chainveyors, while simulated automotive die-press caused the floor to "rumble" as each automotive part was pressed. Video monitors provided real GM workers a chance to tell EPCOT visitors how they felt about their products and their work.

2012–present

Queue
The first queue uses the same area as the old but is themed to Chevrolet's Design Studio. Riders pass by two concept cars, the Chevrolet Miray, and the Chevrolet EN-V. After, the standby queue leads to a section where a small model car is drawn on through projections while one of Chevrolet's employees discusses the design process for cars. Then the standby queue goes by large touchscreens where riders can take tutorials on how to design a car. Once at the front of the queue, riders use their MagicBand, park ticket, or receive a white RFID card called a "design key" and wait for a set of doors to open leading into one of the two design studios. Once in the studio, riders have a set amount of time (that depends on how busy the attraction is) to design their own "Chevrolet Custom Concept Vehicle" that will be tested on the sim-track based on four criteria: Capability, Efficiency, Responsiveness or Power. Once the time expires, riders move to the second queue which leads to the boarding area. For Lightning Lane riders, the queue goes directly to the main design studios. For single riders, guests use their MagicBand, ticket, or a design key to select a pre-designed vehicle from one of the four: Capability, Efficiency, Responsiveness or Power. Once guests select their vehicle, they move to the same second queue. While waiting to board the sim-cars, all guests must scan their MagicBand, ticket, or design key again at the gate to upload their Chevrolet Custom Concept Vehicle to the sim-car.

Ride
After riders board the sim-cars and the seat belts are fastened, the car that they designed will undergo four different tests: capability, efficiency, responsiveness, and power.

In the capability test, the car first connects to OnStar, then accelerates past a rain projection and skids out of control. Next, the continuing path disappears and the sim-car turns around to speed up again. A short time later, the sim-car makes a sharp left turn as a lightning bolt strikes. The car then passes by a futuristic city. Following the capability test, the results of which car designs scored the best in the test are displayed.

The sim-car then begins the efficiency test. In the first part, the sim-cars are scanned for "optimum eco-efficiency". The second test performs an aero-dynamic test on the vehicle. Finally, "hyper-spectrum imaging" takes place. On the screen, guests can spot a WED Performance text inscribed on one of the tires, in honor of W.E.D., Walter Elias Disney’s initials and the original name of Walt Disney Imagineering, the division of the company that built theme parks. There are numerous websites, along with a Hidden Mickey that is difficult to find. Again, after the test is complete, the best scores are displayed.

The third test, responsiveness, is next. The sim-car accelerates around hairpin turns with laser-projected trees. Along the way, a sign can be seen with the "turn right to go left" quote from the 2006 Disney Pixar film Cars. The sim-car then enters a tunnel to encounter the 18-wheeler from the original version though it is now shown with lasers. When the vehicle exits the tunnel, the results for the responsiveness test are displayed and all of the test icons are displayed.

The final test is power where the sim-car stops for a moment. It then accelerates through flashing purple arches towards a wall with the ride's logo on it. The doors split open and the car exits the building. Guests can spot a sign with the number 82 just before the drop. This is followed by another one with a futuristic city picture, which is a reference to World of Motion. The sim-car accelerates along a straightaway until it crosses over Avenue of the Stars as guests get their pictures taken. Guests spot a second sign that pays tribute to World of Motion, this time with the logo and the "FN2BFRE" text, referencing to the former ride's theme song, at which point the sim-car makes a 90 degree right turn, then a 270 degree left turn circling over an employee parking lot. Exiting the turn, the sim car then travels back down another straightaway before making a complete counterclockwise circle around the ride building. When the test is complete, the vehicle descends back to the loading station where the next riders board.

Post Show
Guests can then use their MagicBand, ticket, or design key that has their Chevrolet Custom Concept Vehicle that they made in the Design Studio to see their scores from the ride, play games and make an ad in the "Chevrolet Showroom." In the showroom, guests can also check out some of the newest Chevrolet vehicles, take virtual photos with their custom-designed cars and make Sim-Car cards with their cars using their MagicBand, ticket, or design key. There is also a gift shop located at the exit like the original version of the ride.

Many World of Motion logos can be found throughout the attraction. These logos are references to the old attraction and can be found on trash bins, murals, and the attraction's main sign.

See also
 2012 in amusement parks
 Epcot attraction and entertainment history
 Journey to the Center of the Earth, the second generation of Test Track technology, located at Tokyo DisneySea, at Tokyo, Japan.
 Radiator Springs Racers, a similar attraction at Disney California Adventure themed after the Cars franchise.

References

Bibliography
 Florida, DK Eyewitness Travel Guides, 2004, pg 150

External links

 Walt Disney World Resort – Test Track
 Video (POV) of the new Test Track
 Video (POV) of the old Test Track

Amusement rides introduced in 1999
Amusement rides manufactured by Dynamic Structures
Chevrolet
Epcot
Future World (Epcot)
World Discovery
Walt Disney Parks and Resorts attractions
1999 establishments in Florida